The Anglican Diocese of North East Caribbean and Aruba was originally established in 1842 as the Diocese of Antigua and the Leeward Islands when the Anglican Diocese of Barbados, then with the Diocese of Jamaica, one of the two dioceses covering the Caribbean, was sub-divided. In 1842 (shortly after division), her jurisdiction was described as "Montserrat, Barbuda, St Kitt's, Nevis, Anguilla, Virgin Isles, Dominica". In 2017 the diocese celebrated its 175th anniversary.

The Anglican Diocese of North East Caribbean and Aruba is one of the eight dioceses within the Province of the West Indies and comprises the twelve islands of Antigua, Barbuda, Dominica, Montserrat, Anguilla, Aruba, Nevis, Saba, St. Barts, St. Eustatius, St. Christopher, also known as St. Kitts, and St. Martin/St. Maarten. The diocesan cathedral is the Cathedral of St. John the Divine, St John's Cathedral, located on upper Newgate Street in the capital city of St John, Antigua.

Originally, the diocese was under the jurisdiction of the Archbishop of Canterbury until 1883, when the Province of the West Indies was created. As such, it was the Established Church in all British overseas territories within the Caribbean region, and therefore was primarily supported by public funds until disestablishment in 1969. The diocese remains a constituent diocese within the Anglican Province of the West Indies, which remains a constituent province within the worldwide Anglican Communion.

Bishops

(1842–1857) The Rt. Rev Daniel Gateward Davis  
(1858–1859) The Rt. Rev Stephen Jordan Rigaud 
(1860–1895) The Rt. Rev William Waldron Jackson 
On account of Jackson's illness and permanent return to England, coadjutor bishops were appointed to minister in the diocese:
1879–1882 John Mitchinson
1882–1895 Charles Branch, who automatically succeeded to the diocesan See on Jackson's death
(1895-1896) The Rt. Rev Charles James Branch 
(1897-1904) The Rt. Rev Herbert Mather 
(1905-1910) The Rt. Rev Walter Farrar 
(1911-1936) The Most Rev. the Hon. Edward Hutson (also Archbishop of the West Indies, 1922–36)
(1937-1943) The Rt. Rev George Sumner Hand 
(1944-1952) The Rt. Rev Nathaniel William Newham Davis 
(1953-1969) The Rt. Rev Donald Roland Knowles 
(1970-1998) The Most Rev. the Hon. Dr. Orland Ugham Lindsay (also Archbishop of the West Indies, 1986–98)
(1998-2021) The Rt. Rev Leroy Errol Brooks 
(2022-present) The Rt. Rev Ernest Alroy Flemming

Deans

 The Very Rev. Henry Young Shepherd (1906-1930)
 The Very Rev. George Sumner Hand (1930-1943)
 The Very Rev. George Stanley Baker (1943-1970)
 The Most Rev. the Hon. Dr. Orland Ugham Lindsay (1971)
 The Very Rev. Fitzroy Elderfield Pestaina (1971-1976)
 The Very Rev. Hilton Manasseh Carty (1977-1986)
 The Very Rev. William Vincent Lake (1986-2003)
 The Very Rev. James Rudolph Smithen (2003-2016)
 The Very Rev. Ernest Alroy Flemming (2016 - 2022)
 The Very Rev. Dwayne Cassius (2022 - present)

Archdeacons
In 1866, there were two archdeaconries: George Clarke was Archdeacon of Antigua and George Meade Gibbs of St Christopher's. At present there are three archdeaconries. 
The Southern Archdeaconry, which includes Antigua, Barbuda, Montserrat and Dominica.
The Central Archdeaconry, which includes St. Kitts and Nevis.
The Northern Archdeaconry, which includes St. Bartholomew, St. Martin/St. Maarten, Saba, St. Eustatius, Anguilla and Aruba.
The. Venerable Peter Daley (retired)
The Venerable Alston Percival (retired)
The. Venerable Valentine Hodge (retired)
The. Venerable Franklin Reid (retired)
The. Venerable Isaiah Phillip (Central)
The. Venerable Terrance Rawlins (Northern)
The. Venerable Clarence Joseph (Southern)

Canons, Priests and Deacons
Canons
Rev. Canon Emmerson Richardson (retired)
Rev. Canon Selina Joseph (retired)
Rev. Canon Allston Jacobs (retired)
Rev. Canon Bernard Hodge (deceased)
Rev. Canon John Rohim
Rev. Canon Glenville Edwards
Rev. Canon Reid B. Simon

Priests:
Rev. Fr. Allister Rawlins (retired)
Rev. Fr. Irad Hodge (retired)
Rev. Fr. Menes Hodge (retired)
Rev. Fr. Sydney Jacob (retired)
Rev. Fr. Wilfred Daniel (retired)
Rev. Fr. St. Clair Williams (retired)
Rev. Fr. Spencer Skerritt (deceased)
Rev. Fr. Victor Peters (deceased)
Rev. Fr. Daniel Bramble (deceased)
Rev. Fr. Christopher Archibald
Rev. Fr. Carlisle Vyphuis
Rev. Yvette Bagnall
Rev. Pauline Ramsey-Burns
Rev. Judith Archibald
Rev. Fr. Raliville Christian
Rev. Fr. Christopher Roberts
Rev. Fr. Daren Carlos
Rev. Fr. Joel St. Rose
Rev. Fr. Thanduxolo Noketshe

Deacons:
Rev. George Richards
Rev. Catherine Edwards
Rev. Michael Irish
Rev. Leroy Hodge
Rev. Joseph Edmeade
Rev. Hanley Browne

References

External links 

 Official website

Christianity in Antigua and Barbuda
Anglican bishops in the Caribbean by diocese
Anglican Church in the Caribbean
Antigua and Barbuda religion-related lists
Anglican dioceses in North America
Church in the Province of the West Indies